Bezymyanka is a station on the First Line of the Samara Metro. It opened on 26 December 1987 as one of the four initial stations on the line. It is in the Sovetsky district of Samara at the intersection of Ulitsa Pobedy and Novo-Vokzalnaya Ulitsa. Its name comes from a  located 700 m southeast and literally means "unnamed".

References

External links
 Official station page

Samara Metro stations
Railway stations in Russia opened in 1987
Railway stations located underground in Russia